The Retreat is a 2020 American horror film written and directed by Bruce Wemple. Set in the Adirondack High Peaks of upstate New York, the film stars Grant Schumacher as Gus, a man who, during a winter backpacking trip with his friend Adam (Dylan Grunn), finds himself tormented by a wendigo.

The Retreat was released on DVD and video on demand on November 10, 2020.

Cast

Reception
Dakota Dahl of Rue Morgue magazine called the film "a pretty fun psychological thriller/monster movie mashup", and wrote that "While the monster scenes are hit or miss, the film's slippery grip on reality can be fun, especially for anyone who has dabbled in hallucinogens before."

References

External links
 
 

American horror films
2020 films
2020 horror films
American psychological thriller films
2020 psychological thriller films
American monster movies
2020s monster movies
Films set in New York (state)
Films set in forests
Films about drugs
Wendigos in popular culture
Films based on Native American mythology
2020s English-language films
2020s American films